This is a list of awards and nominations received by South Korean singer Taemin, member of South Korean boy band Shinee.


Awards and nominations

Other accolades

Honors

See also
 List of awards and nominations received by Shinee

References

Awards
Taemin